Following is a list of notable architects from the country of Slovakia.

A–M

 László Hudec (also known as Ladislav Hudec)
 Dušan Jurkovič

N–Z

 Emery Roth
 Andrew Steiner
 Fridrich Weinwurm
 Ernst Wiesner (1890–1971)

See also

 List of architects
 List of Slovaks

References

Slovak
Architects